This is a complete list of members of the United States Senate during the 2nd United States Congress listed by seniority, from March 4, 1791, to March 3, 1793.

The order of service is based on the commencement of the senator's first term, with senators entering service the same day ranked alphabetically. The Senate subsequently assigned a consecutive official number to each senator, which is the second number given in the table.

During this time, there were no official parties, but senators are labeled as Pro-Administration (P), and Anti-Administration (A).

Terms of service

U.S. Senate seniority list

See also
2nd United States Congress
List of members of the United States House of Representatives in the 2nd Congress by seniority

Notes

External links

Senate Journal, First Forty-three Sessions of Congress
List of members of the 1st Congress

002
Senate Seniority